Bambous Etoile de L'ouest Sports Club is a Mauritian football club based in Bambous, Rivière Noire District. In 2012, they play in the National Division of the Mauritian League, the second division in Mauritian football.

Ground
Their home stadium is Stade Germain Comarmond (cap. 5,000) in Bambous.

See also
 Mauritius Football Association
 List of football clubs in Mauritius

References

Football clubs in Mauritius
Bambous, Mauritius